The Journal of Religious & Theological Information is a peer-reviewed academic journal published by Routledge that covers research in the field of library and information studies as relating to religious studies and related fields, including philosophy, ethnic studies, anthropology, sociology, and history.

External links 
 

Taylor & Francis academic journals
Quarterly journals
English-language journals
Publications established in 1992
Religious studies journals
Library and information science journals